Star Trek Beyond: Music from the Motion Picture is a soundtrack album for the 2016 film, Star Trek Beyond, composed by Michael Giacchino. The soundtrack album was released in physical form on July 29, 2016, through Varèse Sarabande, as the follow-up to the critically successful 2009 soundtrack album Star Trek and the 2013 soundtrack album Star Trek Into Darkness.

Track listing

Personnel
Credits adopted from Allmusic:

Production
Michael Giacchino – composer, producer
Alexander Courage – original material
Gene Roddenberry – original material
J. J. Abrams – executive producer
Hollywood Studio Symphony – orchestra
Reggie Wilson – orchestra contractor
Page LA Studio Voices – choir/chorus
Bobbi Page – vocal contractor

Orchestration, management and technical
Warren Brown – editing assistant
Vincent Cirilli – Pro Tools
David Coker – composer's assistant
Andrea Datzman – vocal coordinator
Stephen Davis – editing
Patricia Sullivan Fourstar – mastering
Joel Iwataki – engineer, mixing
Jeff Kryka – orchestration
Tim Lauber – scoring recordist
Jason Richmond – soundtrack coordination
Tim Simonec – conductor, orchestration
Randy Spendlove – executive in charge of music
Denis St. Amand – stage engineer
Tom Steel – stage manager
Damon Tedesco – stage manager
Robert Townson – executive in charge of music
Eric Wegener – editing assistant
Booker White – music preparation
Mae Crosby - live to picture consultant

Charts

See also
 List of Star Trek composers and music
 "Sledgehammer" - Original song for Star Trek Beyond by Rihanna and co-written by Sia.

References

External links
 Star Trek Beyond: Music from the Motion Picture at Varèse Sarabande

Music based on Star Trek
2016 soundtrack albums
Science fiction soundtracks
Varèse Sarabande soundtracks
Michael Giacchino soundtracks
Action film soundtracks
Science fiction film soundtracks